Ulster Defence Regiment battalions were located throughout Northern Ireland. The bases were a mix of regimental, battalion, company and platoon locations.

Regimental headquarters
HQUDR was based at Thiepval Barracks, Lisburn.  This location was also home to the 39 Infantry Brigade (39 Bde) and Headquarters Northern Ireland (HQNI).

Training centre
The UDR's main training centre was located at Ballykinlar Army Base where the battalion headquarters of the 3rd (County Down) Battalion were also situated.

Battalion locations

The regiment was reduced to nine battalions in 1984, then to seven in 1991. 9th (County Antrim) Battalion was formed in 1972 from two companies of the 1st Battalion. As part of the Options for Change review, it was amalgamated with 1 UDR again in 1991.

Battalion dispersals
The dispersal of UDR soldiers into their areas of responsibility was through sub-barracks, as illustrated in the table below, which could hold several companies or perhaps just a platoon. Battalion Headquarters would be located in a major town (usually the county town but not always as some counties had two Battalions). Guarded by a permanent cadre of soldiers these barracks would become doubly active after 6 p.m. as part-time soldiers arrived for evening duties. After Ulsterisation began in 1976 many battalion headquarters eventually had full-sized permanent cadre companies attached and these would maintain a 24-hour presence in the battalion's Tactical Area of Responsibility. In each battalion area, sub headquarters units would maintain direct contact with their own men and Battalion HQ by radio. In many cases, the radios were operated by Greenfinches whose husbands or sons were out on patrol. This led to tense moments when mobile units or foot patrols came under attack and submitted a "contact report" (contact with the enemy) by radio.

An example of this structure can be seen in the make-up of 2 UDR based at Drummad Barracks in Armagh:

County connections
The raising of citizen militias has a history in Ireland stretching back to the creation of the Irish Militia in 1793. The Militia itself was officially disbanded in 1908 and replaced with the Territorial Force (in Ireland, it was called the Special Reserve and, after the Great War, the Supplementary Reserve), which later became the Territorial Army.

Some battalions of the Irish Militia remained on the Army list (in name only) until 1953 as part of the Territorial Army; The 5th Royal Inniskilling Fusiliers: 6th Royal Ulster Rifles and 5th Royal Irish Fusiliers.

The raising of the Ulster Defence Regiment followed the practice of raising citizen militias in Ireland for two reasons:
it was raised as a home defence force with its battalions based in the counties;
it existed under separate legislation to that which empowered the Army.

The raising of battalions on a county basis followed the pattern of raising militias. There were, however, several exceptions with the UDR. Belfast was not a county borough in 1793 and previous militia units in County Londonderry did not use a county or city suffix and were simply known as "Derry" or "Londonderry".

The county connections are:
County Antrim (1 UDR) – The Antrim Regiment of Militia, later known as the Antrim (Queen's Royal Rifles) Militia and (in 1881) 4th Royal Irish Rifles.
County Armagh (2 UDR) – The Armagh Regiment of Militia, later known as the Armagh Light Infantry and (in 1881) 3rd Princess Victoria's Regiment (Royal Irish Fusiliers).
County Down (3 UDR) – The Down Regiment of Militia, later known as the Royal North Down Rifles (here there is a tenuous connection with 7 UDR) and (in 1881) split into two separate units, 3 Royal Irish Rifles (the North Down Militia) and the Royal South Down Light Infantry, later known as 5 Royal Irish Rifles (the South Down Militia).
County Fermanagh (4 UDR) – The Fermanagh Regiment which became the Fermanagh Light Infantry and (in 1881) the 3rd Royal Inniskilling Fusiliers.
County Londonderry (5 UDR) – The Londonderry Regiment, later known as the Londonderry Light Infantry and (in 1881) briefly as the 4th Royal Inniskilling Fusiliers before being transferred to the Royal Artillery as 9th Brigade, North Irish Division RA.
County Tyrone (6 UDR) – The Tyrone Regiment, later the Royal Tyrone Regiment and the Royal Tyrone Fusliers Militia before being renamed the 5th Royal Inniskilling Fusiliers and finally the 4th Royal Inniskilling Fusiliers.

References

Bibliography
 A Testimony to Courage – the Regimental History of the Ulster Defence Regiment 1969 – 1992, John Potter, Pen & Sword Books Ltd, 2001, 
 The Ulster Defence Regiment: An Instrument of Peace?, Chris Ryder 1991 
 Echo Company, The History of E Company 5th Battalion of the Ulster Defence Regiment, by Ronnie Gamble 2007. 

Ulster Defence Regiment
Installations of the British Army